Anilkumar Khanna (born 20 October 1936) is an Indian former cricketer. He played 33 first-class matches for Delhi between 1955 and 1967.

See also
 List of Delhi cricketers

References

External links
 

1936 births
Living people
Indian cricketers
Delhi cricketers
Cricketers from Delhi